Leading Edge Games was an American game company that produced role-playing games and game supplements.

History
Leading Edge Games published Phoenix Command in 1986, and Living Steel in 1987.

Aliens Board Game was published in 1989 and the Aliens Adventure Game was published by Leading Edge Games in 1991.

References

Role-playing game publishing companies